Polycarpon tetraphyllum, commonly known as four-leaved allseed (also fourleaf allseed or fourleaf manyseed), is a plant of the family Caryophyllaceae. An annual herb growing to 15 cm in height, it is found on sandy soils, in coastal areas and on wasteland. Native to Europe, it is also naturalised in parts of North America, Australia and elsewhere. It is rare in Britain, except in the Scilly Isles.

Description 
Polycarpon tetraphyllum is a prostrate, herbaceous, annual plant. The stems produce many branches, and leaves are obovate and glabrous.

The inflorescence consists of loose clusters of many small flowers at the end of each stem. The seeds are rounded and 0.4 - 0.5 mm long.

Distribution and habitat 
Polycarpon tetraphyllum is native to Southern Europe, the British Isles, the Mediterranean region, the middle east, and the Indian subcontinent. It has been introduced to the Americas, Australia, New Zealand, and Southeast Asia.

The plant tends to grow in disturbed, shady areas. It is commonly found as a weed growing in crevices in roads, gardens, and fields.

References

External links
Jepson Manual Treatment
USDA Plants Profile
Flora of North America
Photo gallery

Caryophyllaceae
Flora of Europe
Plants described in 1759
Taxa named by Carl Linnaeus